Ancestral sin, generational sin, or ancestral fault, is the doctrine that individuals inherit the judgement for the sin of their ancestors.

The classical scholar Martin West draws a distinction between an ancestral curse and an inherited guilt, punishment, adversity or genetic corruption.

Background 

The most detailed discussion of the concept is found in Proclus's De decem dubitationibus circa Providentiam, a propaedeutic handbook for students at the Neoplatonic Academy in Athens. Proclus makes clear that the concept is of hallowed antiquity, and making sense of the apparent paradox is presented as a defense of ancient Greek religion. The main point made is that a city or a family is to be seen as a single living being more sacred than any individual human life.

The doctrine of ancestral fault is similarly presented as a tradition of immemorial antiquity in ancient Greek religion by Celsus in his True Doctrine, a polemic against Christianity. Celsus is quoted as attributing to  "a priest of Apollo or of Zeus" the saying that "the mills of the gods grind slowly, even to children's children, and to those who are born after them". The idea of divine justice taking the form of collective punishment is also ubiquitous in the Hebrew Bible, e.g. the Ten Plagues of Egypt, the destruction of Shechem, etc., and most notably the recurring punishments inflicted on the Israelites for lapsing from Yahwism.

Teaching by religion

In Christianity 
This concept implicates that "unresolved issues get handed down from generation to generation", but that "Jesus is the bondage breaker ... [and] He is able to break the cycle of this curse, but only if we want Him to."

The formalized Christian doctrine of original sin is a direct extension of the concept of ancestral sin (imagined as inflicted on a number of succeeding generations), arguing that the sin of Adam and Eve is inflicted on all their descendants indefinitely, i.e. on the entire human race. 
It was first developed in the 2nd century by Irenaeus, the Bishop of Lyons, in his struggle against Gnosticism. Irenaeus contrasted their doctrine with the view that the Fall was a step in the wrong direction by Adam, with whom, Irenaeus believed, his descendants had some solidarity or identity.

Eastern Orthodoxy 
Ancestral sin is the object of a Christian doctrine taught by the Orthodox Church as well as other Eastern Christians. Some identify it as "inclination towards sin, a heritage from the sin of our progenitors". But most distinguish it from this tendency that remains even in baptized persons, since ancestral sin "is removed through baptism".

Saint Gregory Palamas taught that, as a result of ancestral sin (called "original sin" in the West), man's image was tarnished, disfigured, as a consequence of Adam's disobedience.
The Greek theologian John Karmiris writes that "the sin of the first man, together with all of its consequences and penalties, is transferred by means of natural heredity to the entire human race. Since every human being is a descendant of the first man, 'no one of us is free from the spot of sin, even if he should manage to live a completely sinless day'. ... Original Sin not only constitutes 'an accident' of the soul; but its results, together with its penalties, are transplanted by natural heredity to the generations to come ... And thus, from the one historical event of the first sin of the first-born man, came the present situation of sin being imparted, together with all of the consequences thereof, to all natural descendants of Adam."

Roman Catholicism 
With regard to breaking generational curses, clergy of the Catholic Charismatic Renewal have developed prayers for healing. 

The Catechism of the Catholic Church, the Greek translation of which uses "" (literally, 'ancestral sin') where the Latin text has "", states: "Original sin is called 'sin' only in an analogical sense: it is a sin 'contracted' and not 'committed' – a state and not an act. Although it is proper to each individual, original sin does not have the character of a personal fault in any of Adam's descendants." Eastern Orthodox teaching likewise says: "It can be said that while we have not inherited the guilt of Adam's personal sin, because his sin is also of a generic nature, and because the entire human race is possessed of an essential, ontological unity, we participate in it by virtue of our participation in the human race. Inasmuch as human nature is indeed unique and unbreakable, the imparting of sin from the first-born to the entire human race descended from him is rendered explicable: "Explicitly, as from the root, the sickness proceeded to the rest of the tree, Adam being the root who had suffered corruption" (Saint Cyril of Alexandria).

Judaism
The Hebrew Bible provides two passages of scripture regarding generational curses:

The Talmud rejects the idea that people can be justly punished for another person's sins and Judaism in general upholds the idea of individual responsibility. One interpretation is that, even though there is no moral guilt for descendants, they may be negatively impacted as a consequence of their forebear's actions.

Hinduism
Some holy writing in Hinduism states,

 

Hinduism has family curses, elsewhere.

Japanese Shinto

Family curses occur, in Japanese Shinto.

Greek mythology
In Greek mythology, the Erinyes exacted family curses. Certain dynasties have had tragic occurrences happen upon them.

The House of Cadmus, who established and ruled over the city of Thebes, was one such house. After slaying the dragon and establishing Thebes upon the earth that the dragon terrorized, Ares cursed Cadmus and his descendants because of the dragon's sacredness to Ares. Similarly, after Hephaestus discovered his wife, Aphrodite, having a sexual affair with Ares, he became enraged and vowed to avenge himself for Aphrodite's infidelity by cursing the lineage of any children that resulted from the affair. Aphrodite later bore a daughter, Harmonia, the wife of Cadmus, from Ares' seed.

Cadmus, annoyed at his accursed life and ill fate, remarked that if the gods were so enamoured of the life of a serpent, he might as well wish that life for himself. Immediately Cadmus began to grow scales and change into a serpent. Harmonia, after realizing the fate of her husband, begged the gods to let her share her husband's fate. Of the House of Cadmus, many had particularly tragic lives and deaths. For example, King Minos of Crete's wife fall madly in love with the Cretan Bull and bore the Minotaur. Minos would later be murdered by his daughters whilst bathing. Semele, the mother of Dionysus by Zeus, was turned into dust because she glanced upon Zeus's true godly form. King Laius of Thebes was killed by his son, Oedipus. Oedipus later (unknowingly) marries the queen, his own mother, and becomes king. After finding out he gouges his eyes and exiles himself from Thebes.

Another dynasty that was cursed and was subject to tragic occurrences was the House of Atreus (also known as the Atreides). The curse begins with Tantalus, a son of Zeus who enjoyed cordial relations with the gods. To test the omniscience of the gods, Tantalus decided to slay his son Pelops and feed him to the gods as a test of their omniscience. All of the gods, save Demeter, who was too concerned with the abduction of her daughter Persephone by Hades, knew not to eat from Pelops's cooked corpse. After Demeter had eaten Pelops's shoulder, the gods banished Tantalus into Tartarus where he would spend eternity standing in a pool of water beneath a fruit-bearing tree with low branches. Whenever he would reach for a fruit, the branches would lift upward so as to remove his intended meal from his grasp. Whenever he would bend over to drink from the pool, the water would recedes into the earth before he could drink. The gods brought Pelops back to life, replacing the bone in his shoulder with a bit of ivory with the help of Hephaestus, thus marking the family forever afterwards.

Pelops would later marry Princess Hippodamia after winning a chariot race against her father, King Oenomaus. Pelops won the race by sabotaging of King Oenomaus’ chariot, with the help of the king's servant, Myrtilus. This resulted in King Oenomaus’s death. Later, the servant Myrtilus, who was in love with Hippodamia, was killed by Pelops because Pelops had promised Myrtilus the right to take Hippodamia's virginity in exchange for his help in sabotaging the king's chariot. As Myrtilus died, he cursed Pelops and his line, further adding to the curse on the House of Atreus.

King Atreus, the son of Pelops and the namesake of the Atreidies, would later be killed by his nephew, Aegisthus. Before his death, Atreus had two sons, King Agamemnon of Mycenae and King Menelaus of Sparta. King Menelaus's wife, Helen of Sparta, would leave him for Prince Paris of Troy, thus beginning the Trojan War. However, prior to their sailing off for the war, Agamemnon had angered the goddess Artemis by killing one of her sacred deer. As Agamemnon prepared to sail to Troy to avenge his brother's shame, Artemis stilled the winds so that the Greek fleet could not sail. The seer Calchas told Agamemnon that if he wanted to appease Artemis and sail to Troy, he would have to sacrifice the most precious thing in his possession. Agamemnon sent word home for his daughter Iphigenia to come to him so that he may sacrifice her, framing it to her that she was to be married to Achilles. Iphigenia, honored by her father's asking her to join him in the war, complied. Agamemnon sacrificed his daughter and went off to war.

Clytemnestra, the wife of Agamemnon and mother to Iphigenia, was so enraged by her husband's actions that when he returned victorious from Troy, she trapped him in a robe with no opening for his head whilst he was bathing and stabbed him to death as he thrashed about. Orestes, the son of Agamemnon and Clytemnestra, was torn between his duty toward avenging his father's death and his sparing his mother. However. after praying to Apollo for consultation, Apollo advised him to kill his mother. Orestes killed his mother and wandered the land, ridden with guilt. Because of the noble act of avenging his father's at the expense of his own soul and reluctance to kill his mother, Orestes was forgiven by the gods, thus ending the curse of the House of Atreus.

Witchcraft

The term witchcraft is not well-defined but, at least within factions, the belief in family curses persists.

Skeptical views 
Modern skeptics deny that curses of any nature, including family curses, even exist, even if some fervently believe in them.

Modern Western attitudes to personal individuality and to individual achievement do not always sit well with notions of inherited sin.
Psychologists and philosophers tend to portray persistent human failings as part of human nature, rather than using "original sin" metaphors.

Historical examples
Nathaniel Hawthorne felt that his family was cursed because of the actions of two of his ancestors, John Hathorne and his father William. William Hathorne was a judge who earned a reputation for cruelly persecuting Quakers, and who in 1662 ordered the public whipping of Ann Coleman. John Hathorne was one of the leading judges in the Salem witch trials. He is not known to have repented for his actions. So great were Nathaniel Hawthorne's feelings of guilt, he re-spelled his last name Hathorne to Hawthorne.

Famous examples

 The Curse of the Braganzas (from John IV of Portugal to Louis Philip)
 The Curse of Tippecanoe; not quite a family curse, as it relates to occupational succession, not genetic, but deserves mention
 The Kennedy curse (from Joseph P. Kennedy Jr. to Maeve Kennedy McKean)
The Dangbar Family
 The Sedgwick family
 The Von Erich family
 The family of Bruce Lee, also known as "The Curse of the Dragon" (Bruce Lee and Brandon Lee)

Family curses in fiction
As he lies dying, in Shakespeare's Romeo and Juliet Mercutio says, "A plague o' both your houses", blaming both the Capulets and Montagues. As the play progresses, his words prove prophetic.

There is a family curse in The House of the Seven Gables.

In Arthur Conan Doyle's The Hound of the Baskervilles, it was thought that the Baskerville family had a legendary family curse, of a giant black hound, "... a foul thing, a great, black beast, shaped like a hound, yet larger than any hound that ever mortal eye has rested upon."

In the 2007 South Korean psychological-supernatural suspense horror film Someone Behind You, a young woman named Ga-In (Yoon-Jin-seo) sees families and friends slaughtering and attacking one another and realizes that she is followed by an inexplicable curse causing those around her to get rid of her. Despite all of this she is constantly reminded by an eerie student never to trust her family, her friends, or even herself. Ga-In has hallucinations of those who would attempt to attack her, then sees a disturbing vision of a monstrous being warning her that the bloodshed will intensify. The film was also released in America retitled as Voices.

See also

 Apostolic succession
 Blood curse
 Christian views on sin
 Concupiscence
 Curse of Ham
 Curse and mark of Cain
 Curse of Turan
 Curse of the Atreides
 Curse tablet
 Demonic possession 
 Evil eye
 Exorcism in Christianity
 Flying Dutchman
 Haunted doll
 Hamartiology
 Jinx
 Kindama
 La Llorona
 Pele's Curse
 Sacraments
 Sacramentals
 Sanctification
 The Scottish Play
 Superman curse
 Theology of Søren Kierkegaard
 Tutankhamun's Curse
 Usog
 Wandering Jew

References

External links 
 How to Break a Generational Curse – Knox Presbyterian Church (Presbyterian Church in Canada)
 Prayers for Breaking Generational Curses – Crosswinds International Ministries (Nondenominational Christianity)
 Inside the Kennedy family 'curse' – CNN
 Inside the 'cursed' Monaco Royal family – Mirror
 Ted Kennedy spoke of a family curse after Chappaquiddick. He had good reason. – The Washington Post

Inheritance
Collective punishment
Sin
Curses
Ancient Greek religion
Neoplatonism
Christian hamartiology
Christian terminology